Aleksi Orenius (born October 24, 1993) is a Finnish ice hockey defenceman.

Orenius made his SM-liiga debut playing with Ilves during the 2012–13 SM-liiga season.

References

External links

1993 births
Living people
Finnish ice hockey defencemen
Ilves players
KOOVEE players
Lempäälän Kisa players
Ice hockey people from Tampere
21st-century Finnish people